Goering redirects to Hermann Goering (ger. Göring), German political and military leader and convicted war criminal.

It can also refer to:
 Carl Goering (ger. Carl  Göring), a 19th century German academic, philosopher and chess master.
 Fritz Von Goering, a 20th century American professional wrestler.
 ,  a 19th century German playwright.
 Werner Goering, an American bomber pilot who believed himself to be the nephew of the aforementioned Hermann Goering

Other uses
 Goering Ranches Airport, a private airport in Oregon, USA
 Hermann Goering Division, a German Air Force armoured division of the Second World War.
 Goering's bread basket, a German incendiary device used during the Bristol Blitz
 Goering's Green Folder, a document presented by Hermann Goering during the Nuremberg trial

See also
 Göring (disambiguation)
 Goring (disambiguation)